The British overseas territory of the Falkland Islands was represented at the 2006 Commonwealth Games in Melbourne by a 6-member strong contingent, comprising 6 sportsmen and women and no officials.  They competed in four events, all of them pairs shooting disciplines.  They won no medals.

Medals

Falkland Islands' Commonwealth Games Team 2006

Shooting
Men's Double Trap Pairs
Henry Donald Alexander McLeod
Saul Pitaluga
Men's Skeet Pairs
Gary Clement
Stephen Dent
Men's Trap Pairs
Henry Donald Alexander McLeod
Saul Pitaluga
Open Full Bore Pairs
Kenneth Aldrige
Christopher McCallum

Falkland Islands at the Commonwealth Games
Nations at the 2006 Commonwealth Games
Commonwealth Games